Henry Trevor Roll (18 March 1905 – 25 May 1967) was a Scottish cricketer.  Roll was a right-handed batsman who bowled right-arm medium pace.  He was born at Alloa, Clackmannanshire.

Roll made a single first-class appearance for Warwickshire against the touring New Zealanders at Edgbaston in 1927.  Roll was dismissed in Warwickshire's first-innings for a duck by Roger Blunt, while in their second-innings he wasn't required to bat.  He also bowled nine wicketless overs in the New Zealanders first-innings, with the outcome of the match ending in a draw.  This was his only major appearance for Warwickshire.

He died at Downend, Gloucestershire on 25 May 1967.  His grandson Lawson Roll played a single first-class match for Gloucestershire in 1984.

References

External links
Henry Roll at ESPNcricinfo
Henry Roll at CricketArchive

1905 births
1967 deaths
People from Alloa
Scottish cricketers
Warwickshire cricketers
Sportspeople from Clackmannanshire